Mzymta (lit. 'the place (-ҭа) of the river Мӡым", Mezmytha) is a river in Western Caucasus, Russia, flowing through Mostovsky District and the city of Sochi (Adlersky City District) of Krasnodar Krai, Russia. Mzymta is the largest river in Russia emptying into the Black Sea. All the venues of the 2014 Winter Olympics were in the Mzymta Valley.

Geography
The upper course of the river is located within the Caucasus Zapovednik. The Mzymta flows in a narrow valley through Lake Kardyvach and forms several waterfalls, the biggest of which is Izumrudny (Emerald), . Downstream of Lake Kardyvach, the river flows west and enters Sochi National Park. The banks are covered with beech forests and chestnuts, and also ancient Ubykh gardens with wild pear, walnut and chestnut. In Esto-Sadok and Krasnaya Polyana the Mzymta flows through the first urban area, where some of the events of the 2014 Winter Olympics took place. Downstream it turns south. The Mzymta comes through Akhshtyr and Dzykhra gorges, popular tourist attractions. Mzymta enters the Black Sea in Adler, where the rest of the Winter Olympics took place. At the mouth, there is a big talus train, dividing into branches across the floodplains. Mzymta carries out to sea large amounts of silt. Mineral springs are also found in the catchment basin. The river is fed by spring tides and rain freshets.

Mzymta is a floatable river, and the popular attraction is rafting. Krasnopolyanskaya hydroelectric power station has a reservoir with a daily streamflow regulation.

Average intensity of flow
Krasnaya Polyana: 
Kepsh:  (max )

Major inflows
Pslukh
Pudziko
Chvizhepse

Inhabited localities
Estosadok
Krasnaya Polyana
Chvizhepse
Kepsha
Monastyr
Galitsyno
Kazachy Brod
Vysokoye
Moldovka
Adler

References

Rivers of Krasnodar Krai
Sochi
Tributaries of the Black Sea